Darrin R. Madeley (born February 25, 1968) is a Canadian former professional ice hockey goaltender. Madeley played in 39 games in the National Hockey League (NHL) with the Ottawa Senators from 1992 to 1995. The rest of his career, which lasted from 1992 to 1999, was spent in various minor leagues.

Playing career

Lake Superior State University (1989–1992)
Madeley joined the Lake Superior State Lakers of the NCAA in 1989–90, and in 30 games with the Lakers, Madeley put together a 21–7–1 record with a 2.42 GAA and a shutout. In 1990–91, Madeley improved his record to 29–3–3 in 36 games, with a 2.61 GAA and a shutout. In his final year with the team in 1991-92, Madeley had a 23–6–4 record in 36 games, with a minuscule 1.93 GAA and two shutouts in 36 games.

Ottawa Senators (1992–1996)
Madeley signed with the Ottawa Senators as a free agent on June 20, 1992. He spent most of the 1992–93 season with the Senators AHL affiliate, the New Haven Senators, posting a 10-16-9 record with a 3.32 GAA and a .905 save percentage.  Madeley did see some action in the NHL in 1992-93, as he made his NHL debut on November 5, 1992, against the Calgary Flames.  In 30 minutes of action, Madeley allowed six goals, as the Senators lost to the Flames by a score of 8–4.  Madeley started for the Senators the next night against the Vancouver Canucks, as the Sens lost 4–1.  Overall, in two NHL games, Madeley was 0–2–0 with a 6.67 GAA and a .773 save percentage.

Madeley saw some brief action with the Senators' new AHL affiliate, the P.E.I. Senators, in 1993–94, playing in six games, with a 0-4-0 record and a 5.77 GAA.  He spent most of the season in the NHL with Ottawa, as the backup goaltender to Craig Billington in 1993-94.  On November 5, 1993, Madeley earned his first career NHL victory, as he allowed no goals in the last 20:46 of the game, as the Senators came back to defeat the Winnipeg Jets 7–6 in overtime.  Madeley finished the year with a 3-18-5 record in 32 games, with a 4.36 GAA and a .868 save percentage.

In 1994–95, Madeley again saw some brief action in the AHL, as in three games, he had a 1-1-1 record with a 2.59 GAA and a .916 save percentage with P.E.I.  In Ottawa, Madeley appeared in only five games, earning a 1-3-0 record with a 3.53 GAA and a .898 save percentage with the Senators.  He also played in nine games with the Detroit Vipers of the IHL, going 7-2-0 with a 2.41 GAA and a .914 save percentage in nine games.

Madeley played in only one game with the P.E.I. Senators in 1995-96, earning a victory.  He spent the rest of the season with the Detroit Vipers of the IHL, where he had a 16-14-4 record with a 3.17 GAA and a .898 save percentage in 40 games.  In the post-season with the Vipers, Madeley had a 3–3 record with a 3.89 GAA.

After the season, Madeley was granted free agency.

Later career
On October 22, 1996, the San Jose Sharks signed Madeley.  He spent most of the season with the Saint John Flames of the AHL, earning a record of 11-18-11 in 46 games with a 3.21 GAA and a .900 save percentage.  In two playoff games with Saint John, Madeley had a 0–0 record, and did not allow a goal in 58 minutes of action.  Madeley also saw some action with the Detroit Vipers of the IHL, going 2–0–0 with a 3.73 GAA and a .868 save percentage in four games with the team.

In 1997–98, Madeley appeared in five games with the Richmond Renegades of the ECHL, going 1-1-0 with a 3.50 GAA and a .875 save percentage.  Madeley also played in two games with TPS Turku of the SM-liiga, going 1-0-0 with a  1.43 GAA.

Madeley spent the majority of the 1998-99 season with the Pensacola Ice Pilots of the ECHL, going 12-16-3 with a 3.08 GAA and a .910 save percentage in 32 games.  Madeley also played in three games with Starbulls Rosenheim of the DEL, going 0-0-0 with a 3.78 GAA.

Retirement
Following his retirement from hockey, Madeley was a coach with the USA Hockey National Team Development Program from 2001 to 2005.  He has been the athletic director and director of hockey at Lake Forest Academy in Lake Forest, Illinois since 2012.

Career statistics

Regular season and playoffs

Awards and honours

References

External links
 

1968 births
Living people
Canadian expatriate ice hockey players in Finland
Canadian expatriate ice hockey players in Germany
Canadian ice hockey goaltenders
Detroit Vipers players
HC TPS players
Ice hockey people from Ontario
Lake Superior State Lakers men's ice hockey players
NCAA men's ice hockey national champions
New Haven Senators players
Ottawa Senators players
Pensacola Ice Pilots players
People from East Gwillimbury
Prince Edward Island Senators players
Richmond Renegades players
Saint John Flames players
Starbulls Rosenheim players
Undrafted National Hockey League players
AHCA Division I men's ice hockey All-Americans